European route E 802 is a European B class road in Portugal, connecting the cities Bragança and Ourique.

Route 
 
 E80, E01 Bragança
 E80 Guarda
 E805 Castelo Branco
 Évora
 Ourique

External links 
 UN Economic Commission for Europe: Overall Map of E-road Network (2007)
 International E-road network

International E-road network
Roads in Portugal